Maria Julia Amorsolo Valdes (born December 11, 1968), professionally known as Eula Valdes, is a Filipino actress, best known for her role as Amor Powers in the original version of Pangako Sa 'Yo (2000) and as Janice in the Bagets film series (1984).

Early life
Eula Valdes was born at Singian Clinic (later became Singian Hospital) on December 11, 1968 in San Miguel, Manila to Estanislao Fermin Valdes (March 28, 1920 in Gapan, Nueva Ecija - March 24, 1988) and Gracia Jorge Amorsolo (November 24, 1927 in Binondo, Manila - February 5, 2004 in Las Piñas). Her maternal grandfather was Filipino painter Fernando Amorsolo. She graduated with a Bachelor of Arts in Asian Studies at University of Santo Tomas Faculty of Arts and Letters and was a volleyball varsity player.

Career

Popularity
Valdez became part of the series Marinella starring Camille Prats, Shaina Magdayao and Serena Dalrymple but she gained more popularity during her portrayal as "Amor de Jesus-Powers" in the ABS-CBN television series Pangako Sa ’Yo in 2000 starring Kristine Hermosa, Jericho Rosales and Jean Garcia. In 2003, she was cast as Mira B. Cordero in the drama series Darating ang Umaga created by Jose Javier Reyes, but the series garnered low ratings. In 2005 she joined Pablo S. Gomez's Kampanerang Kuba playing Lourdes Saavedra. 

In 2007 she starred in the TV series Maria Flordeluna, and after the ending of the series she did a follow-up series on ABS-CBN's rival network titled Kamandag aired on GMA Network starring Richard Gutierrez. Since then she became part of  GMA Network's female lead actress and starred in multiple series such All About Eve, the short-lived Saturday paranormal series E.S.P. and LaLola. In 2009, she went back to ABS-CBN to do the primetime hit series The Wedding, then in 2010 The Last Prince and the afternoon series Koreana. In 2011, Eula was part of the remake of Mula Sa Puso as her comeback project to ABS-CBN where she played Selina Matias (originally portrayed by Princess Punzalan based on the 1997 primetime drama series of the same name). On the 20th anniversary of MMK, she is the most featured actress with the most episodes (32 episodes, as of 2014) and she was hailed "MMK Queen". In 2012, as her comeback as a contract artist she plays Olivia La Peña-San Juan on the film remake turned TV series Mundo Man ay Magunaw which was originally portrayed by Susan Roces and will be Black Lily at the book two of Walang Hanggan.

In 2014, Valdez returned to GMA-7 after Dyesebel and did Ilustrado, Elemento, The Half Sisters, two TAPE Inc. - GMA Network produced shows, Princess in the Palace and Calle Siete, Hahamakin ang Lahat, and the reboot role of Queen Avria in the 2016 version of Encantadia.

In 2017, she switched back to ABS-CBN. She starred in the TV series  The Good Son wherein she portrayed the role of "Olivia Buenavidez", the manipulative and scheming wife of Victor Buenavidez. In 2019, she starred in  The General's Daughter portraying Corazon de Leon, a loving wife and mother. Then in 2020, she played "Lucy Wong" in Love Thy Woman, a fierce and overprotective mother and wife. In 2021, she portrays Deborah delos Santos in Huwag Kang Mangamba, a religious fanatic turned faith healer.

Awards
1998 - Highly Commended in Asian TV Awards in Singapore (MMK: Talaarawan)
2001 - Star Awards Best Actress in a Drama Series (Pangako Sa ’Yo) 
2002 - Jose Rizal Award of Excellence Top Enterntainer Award as Best Actress (Pangako Sa ’Yo)
2003 - Asian TV Awards Best Actress Nomination
2003 - Asian TV Awards Best Actress in Singapore (MMK: Karinderia)
2006 - Aliw Awards Best Actress in a musical (ZsaZsa Zaturnnah)
2011 - Broadway World Philippines Best Featured Actress in a Musical (Nine)
2015 - Young Critics Circle Best Performance (Dagitab)
2015 - Gawad Urian Best Actress (Dagitab)
2017 - Gawad Tanglaw Best Actress (Neomanila)

Filmography

Television

Movies
Martyr or Murderer (2023) ... older Imee Marcos
PAKI(Please Care) (2017)
NEOMANILA (2017) ... Irma
Pwera Usog (2016) ... Catalina
Dagitab (2014) ... Issey Tolentino
Born To Love You (2012) ... Sylvia
Rosario (2010) ... Donya Adela
Working Girls (2010) ... Dr. Cleo Carillo
Ang Manghuhula (2009)
Rekados (2006)
Nagmamahal, Kapamilya .... Louisa (2006)
Ina, Anak, Pamilya (2006)
Noon at Ngayon... Pagsasamang Kayganda (2003) .... Sylvia
Darating ang Umaga (2003) TV Series .... Mira Cordero
Di Kita Ma-reach 
Gimik: The Reunion (1999)
Mula sa Puso: The Movie (1999) .... Criselda Pereira
Babae sa Bintana, Ang (1998)
Magandang Hatinggabi (1998) .... Carla
Pagdating ng Panahon (1998)
Ang Pulubi at ang Prinsesa (1997) .... Rosalie's Mom
Hanggang Kailan Kita Mamahalin (1997)
Batang PX (1997)
Ikaw Pala ang Mahal Ko (1997)
Madrasta (1996) .... Luchi
Sana Maulit Muli (1995) .... Margie
Lagalag: The Eddie Fernandez Story (1994) .... Sara
Tumbasan mo ng Buhay (1993)
Dahil Mahal Kita (1993)
GMA Telecine Specials (1992)
Ready, Get Set, Go! (1992)
Barbi For President (1991)
Kapag Langit ang Humatol (1990) .... Nelia
Hindi Pahuhuli ng Buhay (1989)
Bala... Dapat kay Cris Cuenca, Public Enemy no. 1 (1989)
Rosenda (1989)
Buy One, Take One (1988)
Bukas Luluhod ang mga Tala (1984) .... Monette Estrella
Bagets 2 (1984) .... Janice
Hotshots (1984) .... Elaine
Bagets (1984) .... Janice

Discography

Albums
Schizo (EMI/PolyEast, 2008)

Singles
Minahal Kita (I Loved You) (2008)

References

External links

1968 births
ABS-CBN personalities
GMA Network personalities
Filipino film actresses
Filipino women comedians
Filipino television actresses
Living people
People from San Miguel, Manila
Actresses from Manila
People from Nueva Ecija
Star Circle Quest